The 2011 Sky Blue FC season was the team's third season of existence. Sky Blue played the 2011 season in Women's Professional Soccer, the top tier of women's soccer in the United States.

Review

Match results

Regular season

Playoffs

Standings 

Final regular season standings.

Blue denotes regular season champion, and top seed in 2011 Women's Professional Soccer Playoffs.
Green denotes team has spot in 2011 Women's Professional Soccer Playoffs.

Source: WPS standings*magicJack was docked one point on 12 May for various violations of league standards.**Boston wins head-to-head 2-1-1 over Sky Blue.

Team

Roster 
2011 roster

Statistics

Transfers

In

Out

Awards

References 

2011 Women's Professional Soccer season
Sky Blue FC
NJ/NY Gotham FC seasons